Michael Paterson may refer to:

Michael Paterson, New Zealand born rugby union player
Mike Paterson, British computer scientist

See also
Michael Patterson (disambiguation)